Port Jackson Pidgin English or New South Wales Pidgin English is an English-based pidgin that originated in the region of Sydney and Newcastle in New South Wales in the early days of colonisation. Stockmen carried it west and north as they expanded across Australia. It subsequently died out in most of the country, but was creolised (forming Australian Kriol) in the Northern Territory at the Roper River Mission (Ngukurr), where missionaries provided a safe place for Indigenous Australians from the surrounding areas to escape deprivation at the hands of European settlers. As the Indigenous Australians who came to seek refuge at Roper River came from different language backgrounds, there grew a need for a shared communication system to develop, and it was this that created the conditions for Port Jackson Pidgin English to become fleshed out into a full language, Kriol, based on English language and the eight different Australian language groups spoken by those at the mission.

The concept of ‘pidgin’ 
A pidgin is a language that no one uses as a first language, that is used for limited purposes, that exists for short periods and that has simpler linguistic structures than well-developed languages.

Pidgins form when there is stable, long-term contact between two or more languages, and they generally develop to facilitate communication between groups of people who do not share a common language. For example, Hawaiian Pidgin English formed in the late nineteenth century as Hawaiian, Chinese, Filipino, Japanese and Korean plantation labourers needed to communicate with each other. Pidgins may also develop into full-fledged languages, such as a creole.

Although pidgins are shaped by speakers of two or more languages, the degree to which each parent language contributes to the pidgin differs. The languages most associated with prestige, such as English and Spanish, are called superstrate languages. They tend to provide more lexical items than the local vernaculars. However, the local vernaculars, which are called substrate languages, contribute more grammatical rules. As pidgins serve limited functions, they are likely to develop simple linguistic structures and have smaller sets of words than full-fledged languages. Pidgins also die out when their functions cease, and they are usually associated with lower social status. For example, Port Jackson Pidgin English was called ‘broken English’ by fluent English speakers.

Linguistic viewpoints 
Port Jackson Pidgin English has a relatively complete linguistic structure, including a borrowed lexicon and set of verbs, largely from English. It also contains different word classes, including pronouns, adverbs, adjectives and prepositions, and it uses the same subject-verb-object sentence structure as English. The linguistic feature of Port Jackson Pidgin English observed in the 18th century was mainly lexical, while in the 19th century, the pidgin started to acquire syntactical stability.

Lexicon 
Although Robert Dawson, a company agent of the Australian Agricultural Company, pointed out that Port Jackson Pidgin English is a jargon (also called a ‘pre-pidgin’) with a mixed lexicon and only basic grammar, the language does exhibit great morphological stability. Lexical items borrowed from English are combined with other items from Aboriginal languages to form a pidgin compound. For example, ‘blakjin’—literally consisting of ‘black’ and ‘gin’—means ‘Aboriginal woman’. Replicate morphemes are used to emphasise a word’s meaning. For instance, ‘debildebil’ means ‘great devil’. Interrogatives and quantifiers are also borrowed from English. In the pidgin, ‘plenti’, which can be retrieved from the English word ‘plenty’, means ‘many’. ‘Wen’ is an interrogative word that means ‘when’. Interestingly, while Port Jackson Pidgin English has borrowed considerably from English verbs and lexicon, it has made only a small number of Aboriginal borrowings.

Morphology 
Both free morphemes and bound morphemes are attested in Port Jackson Pidgin English, even though most morphemes are free. Three examples of bound morphemes are ‘-fela’, ‘-im’ and ‘-it’. The first morpheme is a suffix that nominalises nouns, which is retrieved from the English word ‘fellow’. For example, ‘blakfela’ means ‘Aboriginal people’, and ‘datfela’ means ‘that one’. The second and the third morphemes are both transitivity markers. There are also compound words and single morphemes that are English based in the pidgin. For example, the word used to refer to convicts is ‘gabamenman’, which literally means ‘government man’. It is a compound word that consists of ‘gabamen’ and ‘man’. An example of a single morpheme is ‘baimbai’. It literally means ‘by and by’, while the actual meaning is ‘later’.

Determiners 
There is evidence that determiners are present in Port Jackson Pidgin English. For example, ‘dat’ and ‘diz’ respectively originate from the English words ‘that’ and ‘these’. Possessive determiners are also presented. For instance, ‘main’ indicates first person singular possessive form in the pidgin, which is retrieved from the English word ‘my’.

Numbers 
The numbers in Port Jackson Pidgin English are largely English based. For example, ‘menitausand’ comes from ‘many thousand’, and ‘wan’ comes from ‘one’. However, non-specific quantifiers are formulated with different strategies. For example, ‘oranjibita’ consists of ‘narang’, which means ‘little’ in the Aboriginal language, and ‘bit of’ from English. As this word contains lexical items from both languages, it is unique from specific numbers that are borrowings solely from English.

Pronouns 
The pronouns in Port Jackson Pidgin English have considerable similarity to pronouns in English. For example, the pronoun for first person singular is ‘ai’ or ‘mi’, while the first person plural is ‘wi’. It is obvious that these words are respectively retrieved from ‘I’, ‘me’ and ‘we’ in English.

Verbs 
It is also intriguing to note that, despite its borrowing of English verbs, Port Jackson Pidgin English applies linguistic strategies that differ from English. Therefore, based solely on a knowledge of English, the use or meaning of a verb in Port Jackson Pidgin English cannot be presumed. In addition to directly borrowing from English, for example, ‘teik’ retrieved from ‘take’, there are two more ways by which verbs are created. The first is the borrowing of English phrasal verbs. For instance, ‘sitdaun’, coming from ‘sit down’, means ‘stay’. Another way is to create verbs originating from the Aboriginal language. For example, the verb for dance is ‘koroberi’, which is from ‘garabara’ from the Aboriginal language. Another interesting aspect to explore in the verbs in Port Jackson Pidgin English is transitivity. For example, consider the sentence ‘Yu laik blakfela massa yu gibit konmil yu gibit mogo and mok’, which means ‘If you like Aboriginal people, master, you give [them] cornmeal; you give [them] tomahawks and tobacco’. In this case, the transitivity of the verb is marked by the suffix ‘-it’. In addition, tense and aspect are attested in the pidgin. For instance, ‘ai meikit no wot hi/it baut’ means ‘I will make known what he is doing’. In this case, ‘baut’ is the present continuous form of ‘do’, which marks both the present tense and the imperfective aspect.

Sentence structure 
Port Jackson Pidgin English shares the same subject-verb-object sentence structure as English. However, there are subtle differences in how interrogative sentences and negation are presented. In the pidgin, interrogative voice is expressed using an interrogative pronoun (how, why, etc.) at the beginning of sentences or a questioning tone because the initial question word ‘do’ does not exist in this language. For example, the English translation of ‘yu hia massa’ is ‘Do you hear, master?’. In this case, ‘do’ does not have a matching word, and it is not present in the pidgin. Instead, the interrogative voice is expressed by an interrogative tone. The second difference is the expression of negation. The word ‘bail’ is put at the initial place of a sentence to indicate negation of a statement. For instance, ‘bail wi want pata’ means ‘We do not want food’, and ‘bail’ indicates the negation of the sentence.

Historical background 
Port Jackson Pidgin English was established as the need for communication between Aboriginal people and English settlers arose. It was created as a lingua franca in the 1820s, despite that borrowing of lexicon had occurred before it.

Historical factors 
There are two major factors that facilitated the forming of Port Jackson Pidgin English. The first is that environmental shifts occurred on the land. After the English settlers arrived at Port Jackson in January 1788, the lifestyles of the Aboriginal people in the Sydney area changed significantly. The environment was devastated as the settlers cleared the ground for settlement. As a result, the local ecosystem could no longer provide food for the Aboriginal people, and they became increasingly dependent on the settlers for imported goods. Some Aboriginal people started to offer services to the settlers, including guidance and knowledge about the environment. Thus, in exchange for resources, they played an important role in the settlers’ community. As they were being increasingly exposed to the English language, the Aboriginal people began acquiring English as a lingua franca to communicate with the settlers. In this way, Port Jackson Pidgin English started forming at the point of contact between English and the Aboriginal languages. Linguistic evidence supports this summation, showing that pidgin features, including language mixing, language simplification and lexicon borrowing were present in the communication between the Aboriginal people and the settlers.

The second factor was the governor of the First Fleet, Arthur Philip’s actions to establish communication with Aboriginal people. After fixing a permanent settlement site at Port Jackson, Philip gave official orders for establishing a stable cross-cultural communication with Aboriginal people despite their hostility towards the settlers. He also controlled the convicts to prevent them from ‘taking advantage of or mistreating Aboriginal people’. However, due to the absence of a common language between the two communities, he failed to learn about the Aboriginal culture and history or maintain regular and friendly communication. Therefore, he made a plan to capture an Aboriginal person to learn English, help the settlers acquire the Aboriginal language and play as a cultural catalyst between the two communities. The person the settlers captured was Bennelong. He not only learned English and the culture of the settlers, but he also offered knowledge about the Aboriginal language for the settlers. He marked the starting point of a stable communication and accelerated the language contact between the two communities.

Bennelong as the communication catalyst 
Bennelong was an important figure in this cross-cultural communication. He soon came to play a major role in the colony and integrated into the new society well after being captured by Philip. His language abilities not only allowed the settlers to gain more knowledge about the Aboriginal language and culture but also accelerated the cross-cultural interactions between the two communities. Being able to speak two languages, Bennelong became a well-respected person in both the colonial and Aboriginal communities. The settlers needed Bennelong’s knowledge of Aboriginal culture, food, technology and the environment, while the Aboriginal people consulted him when they traded with the settlers. This privilege allowed him to become the head of the Aboriginal coterie, and he enjoyed social and material benefits from his friendship with Philip.

Influences on both communities 
From the linguistic aspect, Aboriginal people who acted as translators and guides in the Sydney area showed a notable ability to communicate with English settlers using Port Jackson Pidgin English. Furthermore, the significance of learning Aboriginal vernacular language decreased and was eventually replaced by the pidgin. From the social aspect, some of the Aboriginal people became functioning members in the colony’s working class because of their knowledge of the land and labour. In addition, with the information provided by the Aboriginal people, the settlers found building materials, and they built residences in water-rich and fertile areas. In the settlement, Aboriginal people offered assistance with chopping wood, fishing and tracking escaped convicts. With the help of the Aboriginal people, the settlers built permanent sites of residence, and the Aboriginal people gained irreplaceable positions in the social division of labour within the colony.

Significance of Port Jackson Pidgin English 
Port Jackson Pidgin English was the main means of communication between the settlers and the Aboriginal people in early colonial times. It provided a channel for intercultural communication. It is also important in terms of linguistics because it formed a basis for the development of Australian Kriol.

Formation of Australian Kriol 
As the English settlements expanded in Australia, Port Jackson Pidgin English also spread. The creolisation of the pidgin, or the sudden shift to an expanded pidgin with nativisation of children, started in the 1870s when the stockmen carried the pidgin to the Northern Territory. By the early 20th century, there were Aboriginal people who spoke the pidgin as their first language instead of a lingua franca. By the mid-1980s, Kriol had at least four generations of mother tongue speakers.

References 
Clements, J. (2003). PROCESSES OF LANGUAGE CONTACT: STUDIES FROM AUSTRALIA AND THE SOUTH PACIFIC. Jeff Siegel (Ed.). Saint-Laurent, Canada: Fides, 2000.

Holmes, J. (2013). An Introduction to Sociolinguistics  (4th ed.). Taylor and Francis.

Kouwenberg, S., & Singler, J. (2008). The handbook of Pidgin and Creole studies. Wiley-Blackwell Pub.

Meakins, F. & O’Shannessy, C. (2016). Loss and renewal: Australian languages since colonisation. Berlin, Germany: De Gruyter Mouton.

Sandefur, J. (1986). Kriol of North Australia: a language coming of age. Darwin, Australia: Summer Institute of Linguistics, Australian Aborigines Branch

Smith, W. (1933). Pidgin English in Hawaii. American Speech, 8(1), 15-19. https://doi.org/10.2307/3181813

Troy, J. (1994). Melaleuka: A history and description of New South Wales Pidgin. Canberra, Australia: Australian National University.

Bibliography

English-based pidgins and creoles of Australia